The Kulekhani Dam is a rock-fill dam on the Kulekhani River near Kulekhani in Makwanpur District of Narayani Zone, Nepal. The primary purpose of the dam is hydroelectric power generation and it supports the 60 MW Kulekhani I and 32 MW Kulekhani II Hydropower Stations. Construction began in 1977 and Kulekhani I was commissioned in 1982. Kulekhani II was commissioned in 1986 and a third power station, the 14 MW Kulekhani III was expected to be commissioned in May 2015 but was delayed due to issues with the builder. The US$117.84 million project received funding from the World Bank, Kuwait Fund, UNDP, Overseas Economic Cooperation Fund and OPEC Fund. It is owned by Nepal Electricity Authority.

Kulekhani I hydropower station
From the reservoir, water is sent to the Kulekhani I Hydropower Station via a  headrace tunnel to a gate house which controls the flow of water to the power station. It contains two 30 MW Pelton turbine-generators.

Kulekhani II hydropower station
Water discharged from the Kulekhani I power station enters a series of tunnels and diversions where it reaches the Kulekhani II Hydropower Station which is also located underground and contains two 16 MW Francis turbine-generators. The dam and reservoir are in the Bagmati River basin while the power stations are in the Rapti River basin.

Kulekhani III hydropower station
Construction of the Kulekhani III Hydropower Station had been underway since 2008 and is now finally complete as of 2019. The Nepal Electricity Authority (NEA) had extended the completion deadline of the Kulekhani 3 Hydropower Project for the fifth time to January 2018 as construction was running late due to its slowpoke contractor. The project’s civil contractor Sino Hydro has completed 100 percent of the construction, and there has been full progress in the installation of the turbine, water gate and transmission lines to evacuate the electricity generated by the plant. It will use the tailwaters of Kulekhani II and have an installed capacity of 14 MW.

Gallery

References

Dams in Nepal
Hydroelectric power stations in Nepal
Rock-filled dams
Dams completed in 1982
Interbasin transfer
Energy infrastructure completed in 1982
Energy infrastructure completed in 1986
Buildings and structures in Makwanpur District
Underground power stations
1982 establishments in Nepal
Artificial lakes of Nepal